Microselene is a genus of moths of the family Erebidae. The genus was erected by George Hampson in 1926.

Species
Microselene mesostipa Hampson, 1926 north-eastern Himalayas, Peninsular Malaysia, Borneo
Microselene mopsa (C. Swinhoe, 1890) north-eastern Himalayas, Myanmar, Thailand, Peninsular Malaysia, Taiwan, Borneo

References

Calpinae